The Ridge Avenue Bridge in Philadelphia is a historic bridge in Philadelphia, Pennsylvania.

A triple-span stone arch bridge built in 1888, it carries Ridge Avenue over the Wissahickon Creek. It is the last crossing of the creek before it empties into the Schuylkill River. Four other stone arch bridges cross the Wissahickon.  The 119.1-ft-long bridge was rehabilitated in 1954.

The bridge was added to the National Register of Historic Places in 1988.

References

External links
Listing at Historic Bridges of the U.S.

Bridges completed in 1888
Bridges on the National Register of Historic Places in Philadelphia
Northwest Philadelphia
Road bridges on the National Register of Historic Places in Pennsylvania
Stone arch bridges in the United States
Bridges in Philadelphia